The 1958 Lafayette Leopards football team was an American football team that represented Lafayette College during the 1958 NCAA College Division football season. Lafayette finished second in the Middle Atlantic Conference, University Division, and tied for second in the Middle Three Conference.

In their first year under head coach James McConlogue, the Leopards compiled a 5–3–1 record. Donald Dilly was the team captain.

In the first year of football competition for the Middle Atlantic Conference, Lafayette finished second in the University Division with a record of 5–1–1 against conference opponents. The Leopards went 0–1–1 against the Middle Three, losing to Rutgers and tying Lehigh.

In the final two weeks of their five-game winning streak, the Leopards were ranked No. 17 in the UPI Small College Poll. They dropped out of the poll after losing to Rutgers and remained unranked through the end of the season.

Lafayette played its home games at Fisher Field on College Hill in Easton, Pennsylvania.

Schedule

References

Lafayette
Lafayette
Lafayette Leopards football seasons
Lafayette Leopards football